Janson Randall Junk (born January 15, 1996) is an American professional baseball pitcher for the Milwaukee Brewers of Major League Baseball (MLB). He made his MLB debut with the Los Angeles Angels in 2021.

Amateur career
Junk grew up in Federal Way, Washington, and attended Decatur High School. He played college baseball at Seattle University, spending three seasons (2015–2017) with the Redhawks after joining the team as a walk-on. During the summer of 2015, Junk played collegiate summer baseball with the Bend Elks of the West Coast League. Junk was selected in the 22nd round of the 2017 MLB draft by the New York Yankees.

Professional career

New York Yankees
Junk spent the 2018 season with the Class A Charleston RiverDogs, where he had a 7–5 win–loss record with a 3.77 earned run average (ERA) over 17 appearances. He spent most of the 2019 season with the Class A-Advanced Tampa Tarpons of the Florida State League, while also making one start each for the Double-A Trenton Thunder and the Triple-A Scranton/Wilkes-Barre RailRiders. 

Junk did not play in a game in 2020 due to the cancellation of the minor league season because of the COVID-19 pandemic. Junk began the 2021 season with the Yankees' new Double-A affiliate, the Somerset Patriots.

Los Angeles Angels
The Yankees traded Junk and Elvis Peguero to the Los Angeles Angels on July 30, 2021, in exchange for Andrew Heaney. On September 3, the Angels selected Junk's contract from the Double-A Rocket City Trash Pandas and added him to their major-league roster. He made his MLB debut two days later, starting against the Texas Rangers and taking the loss. He allowed five runs (four earned) on six hits in 3  innings and recorded two strikeouts and one walk.

Milwaukee Brewers
On November 22, 2022, the Angels traded Junk, Elvis Peguero, and Adam Seminaris to the Milwaukee Brewers for Hunter Renfroe. Junk was optioned to the Triple-A Nashville Sounds to begin the 2023 season.

References

External links

Seattle Redhawks bio

1996 births
Living people
People from Federal Way, Washington
Baseball players from Washington (state)
Major League Baseball pitchers
Los Angeles Angels players
Seattle Redhawks baseball players
Gulf Coast Yankees players
Charleston RiverDogs players
Tampa Tarpons players
Trenton Thunder players
Scranton/Wilkes-Barre RailRiders players
Somerset Patriots players
Rocket City Trash Pandas players